Dakshinaranjan Mitra Majumdar (15 April 1877 – 30 March 1956) was an Indian writer in Bengali of fairy tales and children's literature. He was born at Ulail in Dhaka district of Bengal province in British India (now Dhaka District of Bangladesh). His major contribution to Bengali literature was the collection and compilation of Bengali folk and fairy tales in four volumes – Thakurmar Jhuli (Grandmother's Bag of Tales), Thakurdadar Jhuli (Grandfather's Bag of Tales), Thandidir Thale (Maternal-Grandmother's Bag of Tales) and Dadamashayer Thale (Maternal-Grandfather's Bag of Tales).

Early life
Dakshinaranjan Mitra Majumdar was born in the village of Ulail, near Savar in Dhaka district. He lost his mother when he was nine, and was brought up by his paternal aunt, Rajlakkhi Devi, in Mymensingh. Dakhshinaranjan recounts the memories of listening to fairytales told by his mother as well as his aunt, in his introduction to Thakurmar Jhuli. At the age of twenty-one, he moved to Murshidabad with his father. Education was not his strong suit, he had to change schools multiple times. However, his father's collection of books was a comfort to him. In Murshidabad, he began to write in different journals, including the Sahitya Parisat Patrika and Pradip. At 25, he published a collection of poems called Utthan (Ascent). On completing his F.A. degree, he returned to Mymensingh, and took over the task of overseeing his aunt's zamindari.

Contribution to folk literature
Rabindranath Tagore notes in his introduction to Thakurmar Jhuli, that there was a dire need for folk literature of Bengal to be revived because the only such works available to the reading public of the time were European fairytales and their translations. He expressed the need for a swadeshi or indigenous folk literature that would remind the people of Bengal of their rich oral traditions. This would be a method of contending the cultural imperialism of the British. Dakhshinaranjan's aunt, Rajlakkhi Debi had given him the duty of visiting the villages in their zamindari. Dakhshinaranjan travelled and listened to Bengali folktales and fairytales being narrated by the village elders. He recorded this material with a phonograph that he carried, and listened to the recordings repeatedly, imbibing the style. Inspired by Dinesh Chandra Sen, he edited and published the material he had collected in Thakurmar Jhuli(1907), Thakurdadar Jhuli(1909), Thandidir Thale(1909), and Dadamashayer Thale(1913). He also translated fairytales from different parts of the world in the collection Prithibir Rupkotha (Fairytales of the World).

Other contributions
Dakshinaranjan also edited a number of journals such as Sudha (1901–1904), Sarathi (1908) and Path (1930–1932). He was the mouthpiece of the Bengal Scientific Council of which he was vice-president from 1930 to 1933. As president of the Scientific Terminology Board of the Council he was able to contribute to the development of terminology.

Death
He died of gastric ulcer in his Kolkata residence, on 30 March 1957.

Works
 Thakurmar Jhuli (1907)- This anthology has attained iconic status in Bengali children's literature. In his introduction, Tagore noted that Dakhshinaranjan has successfully put into writing, the linguistic flavour of traditional oral tales. In 1907, Thakurmar Jhuli was published by the renowned publisher, Bhattacharya and Sons. Within a week, three thousand copies were sold. Several illustrations for the collection were also drawn by the author. His drawings were turned into lithographs for printing.  
 Thakurdadar Jhuli (1909)- The tales in this collection are notable for their frequent use of song. The author notes in the introduction, that these were ritual tales, to be told and sung to pregnant women, or on the occasion of the completion of a religious vow or brata.  
 Thandidir Thale (1909)
 Dadamashayer Thale (1913)
 Charu O Haru
 First Boy
 Last Boy
 Utpal O Rabi
 Banglar Bratakatha
 Sabuj Lekha
 Amar Desh
 Ashirbad O Ashirbani
 Manush Kishore
 Kishorder Man
 Banglar Sonar Chhele
 Bijnaner Rupkatha
 Natun Katha
 Rupak Katha
 Srishtir Swapna
 Chiradiner Rupkatha
 Amar Bai
  Karmer murti
  Sonar chala

References

1877 births
1957 deaths
Bengali writers
Bengali-language writers
Indian children's writers
University of Calcutta alumni
20th-century Indian people
Writers from Dhaka
Krishnath College alumni
Writers from Kolkata
People from Dhaka
Writers in British India